Connor Presley (born July 4, 1998) is an American soccer player who plays as a midfielder.

Career
After time with the FC Dallas academy side, Presley went to Europe and trialled with numerous teams. While in Europe, Presley played for non-league club Nostell Miners Welfare and also appeared in Guiseley in a West Riding County Cup fixture against Farsley Celtic.

Presley returned to the United States and spent time with the Lonestar SC academy before he signed with United Soccer League side San Antonio FC on August 10, 2017.

Loudoun United FC signed Presley ahead of their 2019 inaugural season.

In January 2020, Presley joined USL League One expansion side New England Revolution II ahead of the 2020 season.

References

1998 births
Living people
American expatriate soccer players
American expatriate sportspeople in England
American soccer players
Guiseley A.F.C. players
Nostell Miners Welfare F.C. players
San Antonio FC players
Soccer players from Austin, Texas
USL Championship players
Association football midfielders
Loudoun United FC players
New England Revolution II players
USL League One players
Expatriate footballers in England